Franco De Pedrina (born 27 January 1941) is a retired Italian rower who had his best achievements in the coxed fours. In this event he won a silver medal at the 1964 Summer Olympics and a bronze at the 1964 European Championships.

References

1941 births
Living people
Italian male rowers
Olympic rowers of Italy
Rowers at the 1964 Summer Olympics
Olympic silver medalists for Italy
Olympic medalists in rowing
Medalists at the 1964 Summer Olympics
European Rowing Championships medalists